The 2010 NASCAR Sprint Showdown and Sprint All-Star Race was the 26th running of NASCAR's special non-points race involving winners of the 2009 and 2010 NASCAR Sprint Cup Series races through the 2010 Autism Speaks 400 as well as Sprint All-Star Race 2000–2009 winners, when the event was known as "The Winston" and the "Nextel All-Star Challenge", and past Sprint Cup champions from the decade covering 2000 to 2009, including the "Winston Cup" (2000–2003) and "Nextel Cup" (2004–2007) eras. The event was run at the  Charlotte Motor Speedway in the Charlotte, North Carolina suburb of Concord on May 22, 2010. Speed provided television coverage in the US while MRN (over-the-air/terrestrial) and Sirius XM Radio (satellite) held radio rights.

Race format
The format of the race was follows:

 One fifty-lap segment with a mandatory four-tire green flag pit stop at or around Lap 25;
 Two twenty-lap segments with a ten-minute break following Segment Three;
 A ten-lap green flag segment.

Pits were open following the end of the first two segments, where drivers could have opted to take a pit stop, but could have sacrificed their position on the track should they chose to do so. After the first pace lap following the break, teams were required to take a four-tire stop. The order they come out determined the starting order for the last segment.

The qualifying session for eligible drivers was to have consisted of three laps instead of the standard two, including a pit stop after either of the first two laps, slowing to the speed limit of 45 mph entering pit road, but going full throttle as they exit. However, a rainstorm the night before (May 21) cancelled the event, and the first 19 positions were chosen by the luck of the draw for the cancelled qualifying; as a result, Kurt Busch and Joey Logano made up the front row.

Eligible drivers
The following drivers qualified for the race in these categories:

Past Series Champion drivers
The following six drivers were eligible in the Past Champions category:
 48-Jimmie Johnson (Four-time series champion, most recently 2010)
 14-Tony Stewart (Two-time series champion, most recently 2005; also defending race champion)
 2-Kurt Busch (2004 series champion)
 17-Matt Kenseth (2003 series champion)
 24-Jeff Gordon (Four-time series champion, most recently 2001)
 71-Bobby Labonte (2000 series champion)

Past All-Star race-winning drivers
The following five drivers were eligible as a past winner of the event in the last decade:
 9-Kasey Kahne (Sprint All-Star Race XXIV winner)
 29-Kevin Harvick (Sprint All-Star Race XXIII winner)
 5-Mark Martin (Sprint All-Star Race XXI winner)
 39-Ryan Newman (Sprint All-Star Race XVIII winner)
 88-Dale Earnhardt Jr. (Sprint All-Star Race XVI winner)

2009 or 2010 race winners
The following eight drivers were eligible by winning a Sprint Cup points race in 2009 or 2010:
 18-Kyle Busch (2009 Shelby 427)
 12-Brad Keselowski (2009 Aaron's 499)§
 00-David Reutimann (2009 Coca-Cola 600)
 20-Joey Logano (2009 Lenox Industrial Tools 301)
 11-Denny Hamlin (2009 Sunoco Red Cross Pennsylvania 500)
 83-Brian Vickers (2009 Carfax 400)†
 1-Jamie McMurray (2009 AMP Energy 500)§

§ – McMurray was the winning driver in the #26 Roush Fenway Racing Ford in the AMP Energy 500; that team would later be owned by Latitude 43 Motorsports, and McMurray became the driver of the #1 Earnhardt Ganassi Racing Chevrolet for the 2010 season, also winning the 2010 Daytona 500. The #09 team for which Brad Keselowski drove to victory in the Aaron's 499, as well as the #26 team were not eligible unless:
a) the team won a race prior to May 16;
b) won one of the two top positions of the Sprint Showdown or
c) Aric Almirola, who drove the #09 car or either David Stremme or Boris Said, the respective drivers of the new #26 car, were selected in the fan poll.

† – On May 13, Vickers was sidelined with blood clots in his legs and chest, and Casey Mears replaced him as the interim driver in the #83 Red Bull Racing Toyota. Mears would not have qualified for the event; NASCAR gave the team approval for the driver switch.

For those not listed above, a special race, The Sprint Showdown, consisting of two halves of 20 laps [] each was held prior to the main event. The top two finishers – Martin Truex Jr. and Greg Biffle – and a driver chosen by a fan poll – Carl Edwards – were promoted to the main event. Only winning drivers, not teams, are eligible to race in the All-Star Race.

Entry Lists

Showdown

All-Star Race

Qualifying results

Showdown

All-Star Race

Race results

Showdown

All-Star Race

Other events

Induction of the Charter Class to the NASCAR Hall of Fame
On October 14, 2009, the Charter Class of the NASCAR Hall of Fame were announced, consisting of Bill France Sr., the organization's founder, his son Bill France Jr., seven time series champions Richard Petty and Dale Earnhardt and former driver-owner Junior Johnson. The formal inductions were held on Sunday, May 23 on the Ceremonial Plaza of the new building.

Craftsman All-Star Pit Crew Challenge
The annual Craftsman All-Star Pit Crew Challenge competition was held on the Wednesday prior to the event at the Time Warner Cable Arena. Denny Hamlin's #11 team dethroned Jeff Burton's #31 team as champions, and earned the right to be the first team to choose their pit stall for the race.

Pennzoil Ultra Victory Challenge
The third annual Pennzoil Ultra Victory Challenge – judged by former driver Jimmy Spencer, TNA wrestler Jeff Hardy, Carolina Panthers wide receiver Steve Smith along with Scott Stapp and Mark Tremonti from the rock group Creed – was held prior to the All-Star Race. Joey Logano won the event with 67 points.

References

NASCAR Sprint All-Star Race
Sprint All-Star Race
NASCAR races at Charlotte Motor Speedway